Weno, formerly Moen, is an island municipality of Chuuk State of the Federated States of Micronesia (FSM). It is the largest town in the FSM. It has an estimated area of 20 square kilometers.

Population 

The population was 13,856 at the census taken in 2010.

Geography 

It is located in the Chuuk Lagoon. Its villages are in the northwest (Sapuk, Penia, Peniesene, Tunnuk, Mechitiw, Iras, Nepukos, Mwan, Neiwe, and Wichap, Epinup) and serve as the main center of commerce. Weno is the state capital and the second-most populous island of the FSM, with a population of 13,856 at the 2010 census.

The highest point is Mount Teroken, elevation 364 m (1,214 ft).

Transportation

Weno has the only airport in the state, Chuuk International Airport. The road system is not well established in some parts of the island. No public transportation exists, but visitors can use a small taxi to cruise around the island.

There is one commercial shipyard for cargo ships and passenger voyages. The islanders use speed boats and smaller ships to commute with other lagoon islands and outreach islands.

Climate

Education

Tertiary 
 College of Micronesia-FSM

Public schools operated by the Chuuk Department of Education:
 Chuuk High School, Nepukos (Nantaku)
 Iras Demo Elementary, Iras
 Neauo Elementary School, Neauo
 Mwan Elementary School, Sefin

Private
 Xavier High School, Sapuk
 Saramen Chuuk Academy, Nepukos
 Seventh-day Adventist School, Neuo
 Akoyikoyi School, Penia
 St. Cecilia School, Tunnuk

Women 
The Chuuk Women's Council is based on Weno, which provides support to women's rights organizations across Chuuk State, including training in health and environment issues.

Tourism 
Diving is the main tourist attraction on Weno, an industry which was founded in Chuuk State by Kimiuo Aisek. Chuuk State's first museum, Kimiuo Aisek Memorial Museum, was founded to honor his legacy in dive industry and the preservation of Chuuk's underwater heritage.

Popular culture 
Weno is featured on the 10th episode of season 5 of Outback Truckers, where 2 power stations and a switchboard are shipped from Adelaide to provide all-day power for the island.

Sights 
In the east of Weno, the catholic church Immaculate Heart of Mary Cathedral is worth a visit. The church was dedicated at the end of the sixties. It is the seat of the Diocese of Caroline Islands.

Wiichen Men's Meetinghouse is a historic site with petroglyphs and a swimming basin in the east of Weno near the village Peniesene close to Wiichen River.

References

External links
National Government of the Federated States of Micronesia

 
Municipalities of Chuuk State
Islands of Chuuk State